Laja Municipality is the second municipal section of the Los Andes Province in the  La Paz Department, Bolivia. Its seat is Laja.

See also 
 Asir Kunka
 Jach'a Wankarani
 Jani Lawani
 Phujtir Pata Punta
 Qala P'axrani
 Q'ilani
 Turini

References 

 Instituto Nacional de Estadística de Bolivia

Municipalities of La Paz Department (Bolivia)